Ellen Schreiber is an American young adult fiction author.

Biography
Ellen Schreiber is a New York Times Best Selling author and former actress.  She performed in a two-woman show before going on her own to become a stand-up comedian She studied Shakespearean theater at the Royal Academy of Dramatic Art in London and comedy at The Second City of Chicago, which is where she lived for five years. As a novelist she has had several works published in Europe and America. Her brother, Mark Schreiber, is also an author. He helped her start her writing career. The Vampire Kisses series was her first popular book series. It stars Raven, a goth girl who has wanted to be a vampire since she was little, and Alexander Sterling, a vampire who loves to paint.

Ellen has started writing another book series known as Once in a Full Moon based on a human girl Celeste who falls for Brandon who is a human that turns into a wolf at night. The series ended in 2012 with a total of 3 books.

Vampire Kisses series

The Vampire Kisses series is about a high school goth girl named Raven Madison, who lives in a boring town that she calls "Dullsville". Raven finds out that a boy who has recently moved to her town is a vampire and falls in love with him. The series was continued into a manga series entitled Blood Relatives.

Vampire Kisses (2003)
Vampire Kisses II: Kissing Coffins (2005)
Vampire Kisses III: Vampireville (2006)
Vampire Kisses IV: Dance with a Vampire (2007)
Vampire Kisses V: The Coffin Club (2008)
Vampire Kisses VI: Royal Blood (2009)
Vampire Kisses VII: Love Bites (2010)
Vampire Kisses VIII: Cryptic Cravings (2011)
Vampire Kisses IX: Immortal Hearts (2012)

Other young adult fiction
Johnny Lightning
Teenage Mermaid (2003)
Comedy Girl (2004)

Once In A Full Moon (series)
Once In A Full Moon (2010)
Magic Of The Moonlight (December 2011)
Full Moon Kisses (December 26, 2012)

References

Further reading

External links

 Author's Official Website
 Rem's Online Portfolio
  Nabla Ediciones
 "Vampires, mermaids and a little luck; Cincinnati comedienne Ellen Schreiber reinvents herself as a young-adult author" - Jewish News
 "Ellen Schreiber Pens First Manga for TOKYOPOP and HarperCollins!" - Comic Book Bin
 "Vampire Kisses: Blood Relatives: Volume 1" - Comic Book Bin
 "Vampire Kisses: Blood Relatives: Volume 2" - Comic Book Bin
 "Tokyopop's Changes: Life After Tokyopop" - Newsarama

Living people
American writers of young adult literature
Place of birth missing (living people)
Year of birth missing (living people)
American children's writers
American women children's writers
Women writers of young adult literature
21st-century American women